The Rača Monastery is a Serbian Orthodox monastery 7 km south of Bajina Bašta, Serbia. The monastery was built by Stefan Dragutin (1276-1282). The monastery became a place where Serbian rulers, nobles, and church dignitaries were buried. The monks translated texts from Ancient Greek, wrote histories, and copied manuscripts (the most famous scriptorium was in Rača, known as the School of Rača, which flourished from the sixteenth- to the eighteenth-century); they translated and copied not only liturgical but scientific and literary works of the period. 

History of Serbian literature owes most of the creativity to the Račanska škola (School of Rača) and its alumni, Kiprijan, Jerotej, Čirjak, Simeon, Teodor, Hristifor, Gavrilo Stefanović Venclović, etc. Like the monks of Rača, it not uncommon for anonymous writers to be referred to by their first name and the name of the place with which their life or work is connected.

Turkish travel writer, dervish Zulih, also known as Evliya Çelebi noted in his travelogue of 1630 that in Rača Monastery there were 300 monk scribes, who were served by 400 shepherds, blacksmiths, and other staff. The security guard included 200 armed men.

During the Great Turkish War in 1689 the monastery was partially destroyed by the invading Turks. In 1826 it was reconstructed after being burned down several times while Serbia was under the rule of the Ottoman Empire.

References

1276 establishments in Europe
Serbian Orthodox monasteries in Serbia
Bajina Bašta
Christian monasteries established in the 13th century
Cultural Monuments of Great Importance (Serbia)